The 1972 Soviet Chess Championship was the 40th edition of USSR Chess Championship. Held from 16 November to 19 December 1972 in Baku. The tournament was won by Mikhail Tal. The final were preceded by semifinals events at Chelyabinsk, Uzhgorod, Kaliningrad and Odessa.

Table and results

References 

USSR Chess Championships
Championship
Chess
1972 in chess
Chess